Talowah is an unincorporated community in Lamar County, in the U.S. state of Mississippi.

History
Talowah is a name derived from the Choctaw language purported to mean "many rocks".

The community is located on the Norfolk Southern Railway. A post office operated under the name Talawah from 1884 to 1891 and under the name Talowah from 1907 to 1912.

References

Unincorporated communities in Mississippi
Unincorporated communities in Lamar County, Mississippi
Mississippi placenames of Native American origin